Angelle (born Sarah Davies, c. 1980 in Stafford) is a British singer from Birmingham, England. In 2002, her debut single, "Joy and Pain", charted at #43 on the UK Singles Chart. Promotion for the single included her being the subject of Vibe TV, UK satellite channel, paid for by her future husband Steve Bennett, a businessman whose former website jungle.com had a version of "The Lion Sleeps Tonight" as a jingle, as recorded by Paul Da Vinci with vocals by Angelle.

References

English women singers
English pop singers
People from Sutton Coldfield
1980 births
Year of birth uncertain

Living people